Pokrovka is a rural locality (a village) in Maloyazovsky Selsoviet, Salavatsky District, Bashkortostan, Russia. The population was 66 as of 2010. There is 1 street.

Geography 
Pokrovka is located 13 km northwest of Maloyaz (the district's administrative centre) by road. Cherepanovo is the nearest rural locality.

References 

Rural localities in Salavatsky District